Antonino Pizzolato (born 20 August 1996) is an Italian weightlifter, Olympian, and three-time European Champion competing in the 85 kg category until 2018 and the 81 kg and 89 kg categories starting in 2018 after the International Weightlifting Federation reorganized the weight classes. He competed at the 2020 Summer Olympics, in Men's 81 kg, winning a bronze medal.

Career
In 2019 he competed at the 2019 European Weightlifting Championships in the 81 kg category winning the gold medal in the clean & jerk and total. Later in 2019 Pizzolato competed at the 2019 World Weightlifting Championships, he finished in sixth place with a 358 kg total in the 81 kg category.

He won the gold medal in the men's 89 kg Snatch and Clean & Jerk events at the 2022 Mediterranean Games held in Oran, Algeria.

Major results

References

External links
 
 
 
 

Italian male weightlifters
World Weightlifting Championships medalists
1996 births
Living people
Weightlifters of Fiamme Oro
European Weightlifting Championships medalists
Weightlifters at the 2020 Summer Olympics
Olympic weightlifters of Italy
People from Castelvetrano
Medalists at the 2020 Summer Olympics
Olympic medalists in weightlifting
Olympic bronze medalists for Italy
Mediterranean Games medalists in weightlifting
Mediterranean Games gold medalists for Italy
Competitors at the 2022 Mediterranean Games
Sportspeople from the Province of Trapani
21st-century Italian people